Layali ibn awa is a Syrian film directed by Abdellatif Abdelhamid and  produced by the General Organization Cinema in Syria. The film was released in 1988.

Cast 
 Assad Fedda - Abu Kamel
 Najah Abdullah - Um Kamel
 Muhsen Ghazi - Kamal
 Bassam Kousa - Talal
 Tulay Haroun - Dalal

References

External links 
 Layla ibn awa  at YouTube

1988 films
Syrian drama films
Films directed by Abdellatif Abdelhamid
1980s Arabic-language films